Jan Rezek (born 5 May 1982) is a former Czech professional footballer. At international level, he has represented the Czech Republic.

Career
Rezek played for several top Czech clubs before and spent also one season in Russia at FC Kuban Krasnodar. In 2003, he won the Czech Cup with FK Teplice, one year later he won the cup with Sparta Prague. He won the Czech First League in 2006–2007 season with Sparta and also the FA cup in the same year. In 2010, he won the cup with FC Viktoria Plzeň. He is a member of the Czech Republic national football team. In 2011, Rezek was the subject of controversy when he appeared to dive to win the Czech Republic a penalty against Scotland national football team at Hampden Park. As a result, the Czech Republic qualified for Euro 2012 ahead of the Scots.

In July 2013, Rezek signed a two-and-a-half-year contract with Chinese Super League side Changchun Yatai. On 14 July, he made his debut and scored his first goal for Changchun in a 3–2 defeat against Shandong Luneng Taishan.

Honours

Club
Teplice
 Czech Cup: 2003

Sparta Praha
 Czech First League: 2004–05, 2006–07
 Czech Cup: 2007

Viktoria Plzeň
 Czech First League: 2010–11
 Czech Cup: 2010

Anorthosis Famagusta
 PASP best goal of the week: 2012 (3rd 4th Match day)

International goals

Notes

External links
 
 Profile at iDNES.cz
 

1982 births
Living people
People from Teplice
Association football wingers
Association football forwards
Czech footballers
Czech expatriate footballers
Czech Republic under-21 international footballers
Czech Republic international footballers
AC Sparta Prague players
FC Viktoria Plzeň players
FC Kuban Krasnodar players
FK Teplice players
Anorthosis Famagusta F.C. players
Changchun Yatai F.C. players
Apollon Limassol FC players
Ermis Aradippou FC players
1. FK Příbram players
Czech First League players
Cypriot First Division players
Chinese Super League players
Expatriate footballers in Russia
Expatriate footballers in Cyprus
Expatriate footballers in China
UEFA Euro 2012 players
Bohemians 1905 players
Sportspeople from the Ústí nad Labem Region
Bohemian Football League players